Srednja Vas pri Polhovem Gradcu is a small settlement just east of Polhov Gradec in the Municipality of Dobrova–Polhov Gradec in the Upper Carniola region of Slovenia.

Name
The name of the settlement was changed from Srednja vas to Srednja vas pri Polhovem Gradcu in 1953. The name Srednja vas pri Polhovem Gradcu literally means 'middle village near Polhov Gradec'. Srednja vas and names like it (e.g., Srednje) indicate that the settlement lay in some sort of central or middle position. The name is unrelated to names derived from sreda 'Wednesday' (e.g., Središče ob Dravi). In the past it was known as Mitterdorf in German.

References

External links
Srednja Vas pri Polhovem Gradcu on Geopedia

Populated places in the Municipality of Dobrova-Polhov Gradec